The 2022 Individual Speedway World Championship Grand Prix Qualification was a series of motorcycle speedway meetings used to determine the three riders that qualified for the 2022 Speedway Grand Prix. The series consisted of four qualifying rounds at Nagyhalász, Goričan, Terenzano and Glasgow and the Grand Prix Challenge at Žarnovica.  

The preliminary qualifiers were originally due to take place in late May but were delayed to June with a change in venue with Lamothe-Landerron and Abensberg dropping out of hosting a qualifier due to the pandemic.  The 2020 Australian Championship, the American Final and the DMU Qualifier were among the pre-qualifying events staged by national federations to determine their nominations.  The three riders that eventually qualified for the 2022 Speedway Grand Prix series via the Grand Prix Challenge were Paweł Przedpełski, Max Fricke and Patryk Dudek.

Qualifying rounds

Final 
{| width=100%
|width=50% valign=top|

Grand Prix Challenge 
21 August 2021
 Žarnovica

Following the suspension of Artem Laguta and Emil Sayfutdinov due to the Russian invasion of Ukraine, Discovery Sports Events elected to give a wildcard to number one and two of the reserve list of 2022, Jack Holder and Dan Bewley.

See also 
 2022 Speedway Grand Prix

References 

Speedway Grand Prix Qualification
Speedway Grand Prix Qualifications
Qualification